Ice hockey at the 2013 European Youth Olympic Winter Festival was a men's under-18 ice hockey tournament played during the Braşov 2013 edition of the European Youth Olympic Festival (EYOF). It was held at the Brașov Olympic Ice Rink in Braşov, Romania from 18 to 22 February 2013.

Results

Medal table

Medalists

Group stage

Group A

All times local (UTC+02:00)

Group A

All times local (UTC+02:00)

Knockout stage
All times local (UTC+02:00)

5th place match

3rd place match

Final

External links
Results
Brașov Olympic Ice Rink at EuroHockey
EYOWF 2013 - Presentation Video at YouTube
EYOWF 2013 - Facilities Presentation at YouTube

Olympic
2013
2013 European Youth Olympic Winter Festival events
2013
Rom